Suika (in Japanese), which means watermelon, is a Japanese television drama about four roommates, played by Satomi Kobayashi, Rie Tomosaka, Mikako Ichikawa, and Ruriko Asaoka.

External links
 

Japanese drama television series
2003 Japanese television series debuts